Lawrence S. Speed was a farmer and state legislator in Alabama during the Reconstruction era. He was one of five African Americans who represented Bullock County in those years. He was also a Union League organizer in Bullock County.

Speed was enslaved from the time of his birth in Georgia. He was an organizer in the Union League and served in the Alabama House of Representatives from 1868 to 1874. He was also a leader in the state militia.

See also
List of African-American officeholders during Reconstruction

References

Members of the Alabama House of Representatives
People from Bullock County, Alabama
19th-century American politicians
African-American politicians during the Reconstruction Era
Year of birth missing
Year of death missing